Copeland Islands may refer to:

 Copeland Islands, Northern Ireland
 Copeland Islands (Nunavut), Canada
 Copeland Islands Marine Provincial Park, British Columbia, Canada, and the eponymous islands